The Ruined Shopkeeper is a Czech comedy film directed by Martin Frič. It was released in 1933.

Plot

Cast
 Vlasta Burian as Kyllian
 František Smolík as Martin Zemla
 Antonie Nedošinská as Katerina Sustrova
 Ela Poznerová as Pavlína

References

External links
 

1933 films
1930s historical comedy films
Czech historical comedy films
Czechoslovak black-and-white films
Films directed by Martin Frič
Films set in the 19th century
Czechoslovak comedy films
1933 comedy films
1930s Czech films